Hindsiclava henekeni is an extinct species of sea snail, a marine gastropod mollusc in the family Pseudomelatomidae, the turrids and allies.

Subspecies 
 † Hindsiclava henekeni leptalea W. P. Woodring, 1970

Distribution
Fossils of this marine species were found in Pliocene strata and in Miocene strata in the Caribbean area; age range: 15.97 to 3.6 Ma

References

 M. Barrios. 1960. Algunos moluscos del Terciario Medio de Colombia. Boletin Geologico 6(1-3):213–306
 C. J. Maury. 1917. Santo Domingo type sections and fossils. Bulletins of American Paleontology 5(30):1–43
 T. Oinomikado. 1939. Miocene Mollusca from the Neighbourhood of Cucurrupi, Department of Chocó, Colombia. Transactions of the Palaeontological Society of Japan 46:617-630
 W. P. Woodring. 1928. Miocene Molluscs from Bowden, Jamaica. Part 2: Gastropods and discussion of results. Contributions to the Geology and Palaeontology of the West Indies 
 B. Landau and C. Marques da Silva. 2010. Early Pliocene gastropods of Cubagua, Venezuela: Taxonomy, palaeobiogeography and ecostratigraphy. Palaeontos 19:1–221

External links
 Fossilworks: † Hindsiclava henekeni

henekeni
Gastropods described in 1850